Minute Man National Historical Park commemorates the opening battle in the American Revolutionary War. It also includes the Wayside, home in turn to three noted American authors. The National Historical Park is under the jurisdiction of the National Park Service and protects  in and around the Massachusetts towns of Lexington, Lincoln, and Concord.

Sites
 Concord's North Bridge, where on April 19, 1775, colonial commanders ordered militia men to fire back at British troops for the first time. British colonial militia and minutemen killed two regular army soldiers and wounded eight more, one mortally, at the North Bridge Fight. This was the second battle of the day, after the brief fight at dawn on Lexington Common. In his 1837 poem, "Concord Hymn", thinker and author Ralph Waldo Emerson immortalized the North Bridge Fight as "the shot heard round the world". 
At this site also stands Daniel Chester French's well-known The Minute Man statue of 1874. Across the North Bridge, opposite The Minute Man statue is the Obelisk Monument. The Obelisk is believed to be the country's first memorial to its war casualties. Close by is the grave of the two regular army soldiers killed at the bridge and the Old Manse.
 The five-mile (8 km) "Battle Road Trail" between Lexington and Concord, which includes a restored colonial landscape approximating the path of the running skirmishes between British troops and Colonial militia, a monument at the site where Paul Revere was captured during his midnight ride, the Captain William Smith House, and the Hartwell Tavern, a restored 18th-century inn and house on the Battle Road, where living history programs are presented from May through October.  The Battle Road Trail winds through fields and forests and is accessible from several different parking areas.
 The Wayside, a National Historic Landmark, was home to Concord muster-master Samuel Whitney on April 19, 1775, and then, in turn, to authors Amos Bronson Alcott and his daughter Louisa May Alcott, Nathaniel Hawthorne, and Margaret Sidney. The Alcotts called the home "Hillside;" Hawthorne renamed it "Wayside." The house is also part of the National Underground Railroad Network to Freedom.
 Barrett's Farm, about 1.5 miles west of North Bridge on Barrett's Farm Road, is the newest addition to Minute Man National Historical Park. The home of Colonel James Barrett, it was the destination of British regulars who crossed North Bridge intent on searching the farm for artillery and ammunition they thought was hidden there. The house and 3.4 acres of land were purchased and restored by Save Our Heritage, a Concord non-profit that transferred ownership to the National Park Service in 2012.
 Lexington Battle Green, formerly known as Lexington Common, site of the first action on April 19, 1775, is part of the park's story, but the Town of Lexington owns and maintains it.  The Green is also where the Captain Parker Statue by Henry Hudson Kitson is located.

Park visitor centers are located at the hill overlooking the North Bridge and along Battle Road.  The main visitor center, on Route 2A/Battle Road, features a 25-minute multi-media show, "Road to Revolution" that gives a good introduction to the Lexington-Concord events. An eight-minute film at the North Bridge Visitor Center provides a comprehensive account of events leading to the encounter at North Bridge.

Personnel 
The park's lead interpreter is Jim Hollister, who joined its ranks in 2002.

Gallery

See also
National Register of Historic Places listings in Concord, Massachusetts
National Register of Historic Places listings in Middlesex County, Massachusetts

References

External links 

 National Park Service: Minute Man National Historical Park
 National Park Service Digital Image Archive of Minute Man NHS
 Wikipedia articles of the park – Wiki-Map

 
1959 establishments in Massachusetts
American Revolution on the National Register of Historic Places
American Revolutionary War museums in Massachusetts
American Revolutionary War sites in Massachusetts
Buildings and structures in Lexington, Massachusetts
Buildings and structures in Lincoln, Massachusetts
History museums in Massachusetts
Massachusetts in the American Revolution
Military and war museums in Massachusetts
Museums in Concord, Massachusetts
Museums in Middlesex County, Massachusetts
National Historical Parks in Massachusetts
National Historical Parks of the United States
National Register of Historic Places in Concord, Massachusetts
National Register of Historic Places in Middlesex County, Massachusetts
Protected areas established in 1959
Parks in Middlesex County, Massachusetts